The Cenikor Foundation is a nonprofit drug rehabilitation and mental health organization based in Houston, Texas, operating residential treatment centers and outpatient services for adults and adolescents in Texas and Louisiana. They have faced serious allegations of patient abuse and use of patients for unfree labor. Cenikor provides treatment based on the therapeutic community approach.

History

1960s
Cenikor was founded in 1967 by James "Luke" Austin while incarcerated at Colorado State Penitentiary. Austin had previously worked at the new religious movement Synanon in California, and initially sought to start a Synanon spinoff group for Colorado prisoners. When his request to start a group under the Synanon name was rejected by prison leaders, Austin renamed the group Center of the Core of the Individual, shortened to "Cenikor," and reframed Synanon's confrontational attack therapy approach as reality therapy.

After Austin's release, he married Doris "Dottie" Austin, and the two formally incorporated Cenikor on May 27, 1968. The first major facility, housed in a former bakery in Denver, Colorado, was financed by a donation from businessman Charles Kettering III.

1970s
 The Austins moved Cenikor to Houston, Texas in 1972, where the organization expanded rapidly via private philanthropy. The Houston facility was initially located at 1101 Elder in the historic Jefferson Davis Hospital, and moved to the William Penn Hotel in downtown Houston in the late 1970s.

After an investigation by the IRS, Houston district attorney, and a state senator found that the Austins had been misappropriating funds, Luke and Dottie Austin were fired in 1977. Board members Ken Barun, Doug Sadbury, and Edward Fresquez took over leadership of the organization. In July 1978, Luke Austin and several other individuals, including his mother Helen Thompson, were arrested for attempting a violent takeover of Cenikor's Houston and Denver facilities.

In 1977, Cenikor signed a year-round contract with the Astrodomain Corporation, establishing the Cenikor Astrodome Task Force, in which Cenikor patients perform painting, maintenance, field changeovers, and event set-ups at the Astrodome, the Astrohall, and the Astroarena complexes, with as much as three-quarters of Cenikor's monthly budget coming from this contract.

After two years of operating an intake facility in the Dallas/Fort Worth area, the Winn-Dixie Stores Inc. donated two 100,000 square feet buildings in Fort Worth in January 1979 to help Cenikor establish a north Texas treatment facility. Cenikor residents did the work converting the warehouse and two office buildings into a livable facility that could house 180 residents. The first resident entered the facility for treatment on New Year's Eve 1979.

1980s
In 1983, Cenikor received national recognition from the President of the United States, Ronald Reagan, when he visited the Houston facility on April 29. President Reagan commended Cenikor for its ability to operate without government funding, and for its success in enlisting support from the private sector. Nancy Reagan visited the Lakewood, Colorado facility on Tuesday, Aug. 10, 1983 during the national anti-drug campaign. Nancy Reagan also visited the Fort Worth facility in 1986 alongside Texas Governor-elect Bill Clements as she handed out diplomas to 11 graduates.

1990s
In 1994, Cenikor's Houston facility moved from downtown Houston to Deer Park, a suburb in southeast Houston. The new facility, located in the former Deer Park Hospital, is on almost 20 acres of land and 80,000 square feet in size, housing 180 residents. In 1995, Cenikor opened an outreach office in Baton Rouge, Louisiana in a space provided by the city. This location referred over 150 to the Texas facilities each year.

2000s
2007 marked 40 years of providing supportive residential therapeutic treatment services. Cenikor has impacted more than 40,000 lives and in 2007 had more than 500 residents in three long-term treatment facilities located in Deer Park, TX; Fort Worth, TX; and Baton Rouge, LA. In 2007, residents began attending college and vocational training programs in an effort to improve their quality of life while getting treatment at Cenikor.

In 2010, Cenikor formed a strategic alliance with Odyssey House Texas to provide therapeutic community treatment services to adolescents. In February 2011, Cenikor began serving Lake Charles residents in the former state-run Joseph R. Briscoe facility. The 34-bed short-term residential unit maintains a high occupancy rate. The 12-bed medically supported detoxification unit continues to receive referrals from across the state.

On July 10, 2012, a ribbon cutting and open house was held for the new short-term residential facility in Waco. More than 200 people attended the event including Texas State Representative Charles "Doc" Anderson, Waco Mayor Malcolm Duncan, Waco District Attorney Abel Reyna, city councilmen, representatives from Hillcrest Baptist Medical Center executive staff and other community members. The facility began accepting clients on Monday, July 16 for short-term residential and Monday, July 23 for detoxification.

2010s

Charlie's Place Recovery Center in Corpus Christi, Texas came under the umbrella of Cenikor Foundation in 2018. Cenikor announced its plan to introduce its long term residential program to the Corpus Christi facility at this time.

In 2019 the Cenikor Foundation named Louisiana Governor John Bel Edwards its elected official of the year, a yearly honor bestowed by the Foundation on one elected official who has done the most to advance addiction treatment policy.

In 2019, an investigation by Reveal from the Center for Investigative Reporting, (affiliated to NPR and Public Radio Exchange) reported on coercive and dubious practices (including physical and psychological abuse) in conflict with Cenikor stated rehabilitating mission, including patients being assigned to perform physically demanding unfree labour for major companies including Exxon, Shell, and Walmart. Reveal reported that "tens of thousands" of patient-workers have worked without pay in Cenikor programs, and that this practice has resulted in nearly two dozen serious on-the-job injuries and a 1995 death. Following the report's release, state officials in Texas and Louisiana launched multiple probes into Cenikor's operations. In addition, the Compass Group and others who had employed Cenikor patients as low wage labor ended their contracts with Cenikor.

In 2019, Cenikor Foundation opened a new treatment facility in Amarillo, Texas. It was previously occupied by ARAD, Amarillo Recovery from Alcohol and Drugs.

Locations

Corporate office
 Houston, TX

Long-term adult residential facilities
 Lakewood (Denver), CO - 1967 to 2004
 Fort Worth, TX
 Houston (Deer Park), TX

 Corpus Christi TX (male only)
 Amarillo, TX

Detoxification
 Waco, TX
 Houston, TX
 Tyler, TX
 Austin, TX
 Corpus Christi TX
 Amarillo, TX

Short-term adult residential facilities
Waco, TX
Tyler, TX

Corpus Christi, TX

Outpatient services
 Care Counseling Services - Baton Rouge, LA
 Care Counseling Services - Temple, TX
 Care Counseling Services - Killeen, TX
 Care Counseling Services - Waco, TX

Corpus Christi TX

Adolescent residential
 Odyssey House Texas - Houston, TX

References

External links

 Official website
 Odyssey House Texas
 The Freeman Center Waco, TX
 Therapeutic Communities of America
 Association of Substance Abuse Providers of Texas
 Texans Helping Texans
 Better Business Bureau
Remarks at the Cenikor Foundation Center in Houston, Texas

Therapeutic community
Addiction organizations in the United States
Non-profit organizations based in Houston
Mental health organizations in Texas
Unfree labor in the United States